The 2011 Erewash Borough Council election took place on 5 May 2011 to elect members of Erewash Borough Council in Derbyshire, England. The whole council was up for election.

Overall election results

Erewash Borough Council (Summary of Overall Results)

Erewash Borough Council - Results by Ward

Abbotsford

Breaston

Cotmanhay

Derby Road East

Derby Road West

Draycott and Stanton-by-Dale

Hallam Fields

Ilkeston Central

Ilkeston North

Kirk Hallam

Little Eaton and Breadsall

Little Hallam

Long Eaton Central

Nottingham Road

Ockbrook and Borrowash

Old Park

Sandiacre North

Sandiacre South

Sawley

Stanley

West Hallam and Dale Abbey

Wilsthorpe

References

2011
2010s in Derbyshire